Edith Aurelia Killgore Kirkpatrick (November 14, 1918 – April 15, 2014) was an American music educator and politician who served on the Louisiana Board of Regents for Higher Education from 1977 to 1989.

Biography
Born in Lisbon, Louisiana, she studied at Louisiana College (where she graduated as the Class of 1938 Valedictorian and with a Bachelor of Arts), Juilliard School, and Louisiana State University and was a music teacher in McNeese State University and was a Baptist choir director.

She was appointed to the newly-created Louisiana Board of Regents by Governor Edwin Washington Edwards and served until 1990.

She had four children with her husband, state representative Claude Kirkpatrick. Their daughter-in-law, Sandra Futrell, is a daughter of Mayor of Pineville, Louisiana P. Elmo Futrell, Jr. She published a songbook, Louisiana Let's Sing, during her husband's 1963 gubernatorial campaign.

Her alma mater gave Kirkpatrick a Distinguished Alumni Award and an honorary doctorate, and along with LSU offers a endowed music professorship named after her.

She died on April 18, 2014.

Notes

References

1918 births
Educators from Louisiana
Politicians from Baton Rouge, Louisiana
Louisiana Christian University alumni
Louisiana State University alumni
Juilliard School alumni
McNeese State University faculty
Baptists from Louisiana
2014 deaths
School board members in Louisiana
Louisiana Democrats
Journalists from Louisiana
Women in Louisiana politics
People from Lisbon, Louisiana
People from Jefferson Davis Parish, Louisiana
Sigma Alpha Iota
20th-century Baptists
American women academics
21st-century American women